Devil Ship is a 1947 American crime film directed by Lew Landers and starring Richard Lane, Louise Campbell and William Bishop. It was produced and distributed by Columbia Pictures.

Plot

Cast
Richard Lane as Bill Brown
Louise Campbell as Madge Harris
William Bishop as Sanderson
Damian O'Flynn as Red Mason
Myrna Liles as Jennie
Anthony Caruso as Venetti
Marc Krah as Mike 
Anthony Warde as Burke
Denver Pyle as Carl 
William Forrest as Evans
Marjorie Woodworth as Dolly

External links
 

1947 films
American crime films
1947 crime films
American black-and-white films
1940s English-language films
Columbia Pictures films
Films directed by Lew Landers
1940s American films